RAF Rudloe Manor, formerly RAF Box, was a Royal Air Force station located north-east of Bath, England, between the settlements of Box and Corsham, in Wiltshire. It was one of several military installations situated in the area and covered three dispersed sites. The sites are now used by Defence Digital.

History
The station was established on top of quarries from which Bath Stone had been extracted. In the 1930s some of the tunnels had been converted for use as a Central Ammunition Depot.

During the Second World War, the Operations Centre of No. 10 Group RAF was housed there in three buildings (Operations Room, Filter Room and Communications Centre), which were partially buried for protection, in a similar way to buildings for No. 9 Group at RAF Barton Hall, No. 11 Group RAF at RAF Uxbridge, No. 12 Group RAF at RAF Watnall, No. 13 Group RAF at RAF Newcastle and No. 14 Group RAF at Raigmore House in Inverness.

Operations room

The operations room, responsible for directing RAF aircraft in the No. 10 Group area, was initially established in a block adjacent to the manor house in June 1940. The area covered by No. 10 Group encompassed South West England and South Wales. Later in the year the operations room was relocated into the north end of an underground bunker in Browns Quarry. The operations room became disused in May 1945 when No. 10 Group was disbanded.

Filter room
The Filter Room, responsible for filtering large quantities of intelligence on enemy activity before it was passed to the operations room, was located in the south end of the underground bunker in Browns Quarry and became operational in 1940. The filter room became disused in May 1945 when No. 10 Group was disbanded. Eileen Younghusband, who served in various filter rooms, recounted her experiences at Rudloe Manor in her 2011 memoir, "One Woman's War".

The Communications centre was located in the west part of the underground bunker in Browns Quarry. The members of the Women's Auxiliary Air Force who staffed the underground bunker were billeted at nearby Hartham Park.

RAF units using the site were:

RAF Rudloe Manor is known as "Britain's Area 51" since declassified secret files released at the National Archives indicated the site was the centre for UFO investigations in the 1950s.

The wider site continued as both a communications hub and home of various administrative units. No.1 Signals Unit was established to manage all UK terrestrial communications infrastructure for the RAF. With the launch of the UK Satellite Communications System, Skynet, in the late 1960s, the site of Controller Defence Communications Network (CDCN) was established. A spacecraft operations centre was established by 1001 Signals Unit, the spacecraft operations organisation, on a small enclave within the site, known as Hawthorn.

The headquarters of the RAF Provost and Security Service (P&SS) was established nearby, although on the closure of the station it moved to RAF Henlow.

RAF Rudloe Manor was the location of Headquarters Southern Area Royal Observer Corps (ROC) from 1952 until 1980, when it was relocated to Lansdown near Bath. Co-located with the ROC was Headquarters Southern Sector United Kingdom Warning and Monitoring Organisation, responsible for the now-defunct four-minute warning in the event of nuclear attack during the Cold War.

The manor house, built in the late 17th century, was designated as Grade II* listed in 1985.

The site was adjacent to Basil Hill Barracks, the Headquarters of No. 2 Signal Brigade, HMS Royal Arthur and the Royal Naval Stores Depot (RNSD) Copenacre.

The RAF station was closed in 2000, with the Defence Communication Services Agency (DCSA) taking responsibility for the sites, subsequently reorganising into the Information Systems & Services cluster in 2008, and Defence Digital in 2019.

See also
Corsham Computer Centre
MoD Corsham

References
Specific

General

Further reading
Good, Timothy "Above Top Secret: The Worldwide UFO Cover-up", William Morrow Books, 
 Campbell, Duncan  "War Plan UK",

External links

 Rudloe Manor Location (Google maps)
 RAF Rudloe Manor (site 1) photos taken in May 2009

Rudloe Manor
Battle of Britain
Corsham